Rivatex was an association football club based in Eldoret, Kenya.

In 1990 the team has won the Kenyan Cup.

Stadium
The team played at the 10,000 capacity Kipchoge Keino Stadium.

Performance in Caf competitions
1991 African Cup Winners' Cup: First round

Honours
Kenyan Cup: 1990, 1995

Notable players
Sammy Sholei

References

External links
Rivatex - Titles, Statistics - foot-base.com - the portal of football statistics
Head to head stats Power Dynamos FC (Kitwe), Zambia - Rivatex (Eldoret), Kenya

Kenyan Premier League clubs
Football clubs in Kenya